Val Valentine (1895–1971) was a British screenwriter.

Selected filmography

 The Vagabond Queen (1929)
 Alf's Carpet (1929)
 Elstree Calling (1930)
 Why Sailors Leave Home (1930)
 The Rocket Bus (1930)
 The Compulsory Husband (1930)
 The Yellow Mask (1930)
 Almost a Honeymoon (1930)
 Compromising Daphne (1930)
 Song of Soho (1930)
 Old Soldiers Never Die (1931)
 The Love Habit (1931)
 The Wife's Family (1931)
 Poor Old Bill (1931)
 Rich and Strange (1931)
 Kiss Me Sergeant (1932)
 Pyjamas Preferred (1932)
 Get That Venus (1933)
 Captain Bill (1936)
 The Girl in the Taxi (1937)
 Feather Your Nest (1937)
 Cafe Colette (1937)
 Keep Smiling (1938)
 The High Command (1938)
 Come on George! (1939)
 Shipyard Sally (1939)
 Gasbags (1941)
 Waterloo Road (1945)
 I'll Be Your Sweetheart (1945)
 This Man Is Mine (1946)
 This Was a Woman (1948)
 Lady Godiva Rides Again (1951)
 The Belles of St. Trinian's (1954)
 The Constant Husband (1955)
 See How They Run (1955)
 They Can't Hang Me (1955)
 Fortune Is a Woman (1957)
 Blue Murder at St Trinian's (1957)
 Left Right and Centre (1959)
 Friends and Neighbours (1959)
 The Pure Hell of St Trinian's (1960)
 A Weekend with Lulu (1961)

References

External links

1895 births
1971 deaths
British male screenwriters
Writers from London
20th-century British screenwriters